Kaleh Ban (also Romanized as Kaleh Bān; also known as Kaleh Bān 2) is a village in Teshkan Rural District, Chegeni District, Dowreh County, Lorestan Province, Iran. At the 2006 census, its population was 278, in 57 families.

References 

Towns and villages in Dowreh County